Liliya Dusmetova (born 11 February 1981) is an Uzbekistani javelin thrower.

She finished fourth at the 2005 Asian Championships. She also competed at the 2004 Olympic Games without reaching the final.

Her personal best throw is 56.17 metres, achieved in May 2004 in Tashkent.

Competition record

References
 

1981 births
Living people
Uzbekistani female javelin throwers
Athletes (track and field) at the 2004 Summer Olympics
Olympic athletes of Uzbekistan
21st-century Uzbekistani women